The Orthodox Church of the Icon of Our Lady of Częstochowa is an Eastern Orthodox church in Poland honoring the Icon of Our Lady of Częstochowa, considered to be one of the country's national symbols. Construction of the building commenced in 1994 according to a design by Michał Bałasz of Białystok. , the church is mostly complete. The bells and windows had been installed, and the facade completed. However, work on the internal decoration of the building still remains largely unfinished. The cornerstone was blessed by the Ecumenical Patriarch Bartholomew I.

External links 
 Parish Web Site

Buildings and structures in Częstochowa
Eastern Orthodox churches in Poland
Church buildings with domes
Częstochowa
21st-century churches in Poland
21st-century Eastern Orthodox church buildings